Fort Laurens was an American Revolutionary War fort on a northern tributary of the Muskingum River in what would become Northeast Ohio, United States.  The fort's location is in the present-day town of Bolivar, Ohio, along the Ohio and Erie Canal Towpath Trail.

Overview
The fort was built by General Lachlan McIntosh, in early December, 1778, on the west bank of the Tuscarawas River, now in Tuscarawas County near the town of Bolivar. It was named after Henry Laurens, a president of the Continental Congress from South Carolina.  The fort was used as a reference point in defining the boundary line in Treaty of Greenville, although the text of the treaty misspells the name as "Fort Lawrence".

The fort was intended to be a staging point for an attack against the British garrison at Detroit. However, the conditions at the fort were harsh during the winter, and McIntosh removed most of the American forces to Fort Pitt, leaving only about 150 men (from the 8th Pennsylvania Regiment and 13th Virginia Regiment) under the command of Colonel John Gibson. Fort Laurens was the only fort built in the Ohio Country during the Revolutionary War.

The fort was abandoned on August 2, 1779.

Siege
The British learned of the miserable conditions at the fort, and on February 22, 1779, Captain Henry Bird of the 8th Regiment of Foot with a handful of British soldiers and a couple hundred Wyandot, Mingo, Munsee, and Delaware warriors laid siege to the fort. The siege continued until mid-March, and the men inside the fort reportedly were reduced to making a stew of boiled moccasins.

The British forces were also weakened by the long siege and lifted the siege on March 20, 1779. American relief forces from Fort Pitt arrived three days later, leaving a force of 106 men behind under the command of Major Frederick Vernon. Colonel Daniel Brodhead had replaced McIntosh as commander at Fort Pitt and felt the fort was inadequate for mounting an attack on Fort Detroit.

Fort Laurens Museum & Park

The Ohio History Connection owns the site, and the Zoar Community Association operates the small museum at the site on behalf of OHC. The museum's exhibits include information on frontier soldiers, a video about the fort's history, and archaeological artifacts from the fort's excavation.  The museum is located in a large park that is used for military reenactments.  The fort is the site of the Tomb of the Unknown Patriot of the American Revolution, laid to rest with full military honors by the Ohio National Guard in 1976.  A crypt in the museum wall also contains remains of soldiers who died defending the fort.  The site is closed in the winter.

In 1970, the fort site was listed on the National Register of Historic Places.

References

External links

Fort Laurens at Ohio History Central
Fort Laurens, 1778-1779: The Revolutionary War in Ohio - by Thomas Pieper and James B. Gidney.  Kent State University Press (January 1980)
 Friends of Fort Laurens
 Fort Laurens Website  

Laurens
Laurens
1778 establishments in the Northwest Territory
Museums in Tuscarawas County, Ohio
National Register of Historic Places in Tuscarawas County, Ohio
Ohio in the American Revolution
Military and war museums in Ohio
Ohio History Connection
Fort Laurens
Pre-statehood history of Ohio
American Revolutionary War museums
Laurens
American Revolution on the National Register of Historic Places